Hans Fleischer Dons (13 June 1882 – 28 October 1940) was a Royal Norwegian Navy officer. He is most associated with the first manned flight in Norway.

Biography
Dons was born in Øvre Eiker, Norway.  He was the son of Johannes Albrecht Dons (1839-1921) and Johanne Marie Fleischer (1850-1943). 
He attended the Royal Norwegian Naval Academy (1901-05) and  Technische Hochschule Charlottenburg (1907-08). 
From 1909, he served in the Royal Norwegian Navy as second in command on board Norway's first submarine HNoMS Kobben. He was a naval attache at the Norwegian Legacy in Washington, D.C.(1917-19) and held the same position at London and Paris (1927-30). Dons was the head of the Naval submarine fleet and served in the Admiral Staff (1929-35).

On 1 June 1912 Dons performed the first manned flight in Norway in a monoplane named Start. The  fixed-wing aircraft was designed by Etrich Taube and was made in Germany by Edmund Rumpler. A few days later, 7 June, Dons flew from Borre over Horten, crossing Oslofjord to Moss and Fredrikstad – covering a distance of 48 km in 35 minutes.

In 1935 Dons published his book:  Start: En norsk flyvehistorie fra 1912-13 (Oslo: Cammermeyers, 1935). 
Start is on display at the Norwegian Armed Forces Aircraft Collection located at Gardermoen, north of Oslo, Norway.

See also
Aviation in Norway

References

Related reading
John Andreas Olsen  (2014) European Air Power: Challenges and Opportunities  (Potomac Books) 

1882 births
1940 deaths
People from Øvre Eiker
Royal Norwegian Naval Academy alumni
Technical University of Berlin alumni
Norwegian aviators
Aviation pioneers
Royal Norwegian Navy personnel